Azerbaijan competed at the 2020 Summer Paralympics in Tokyo, Japan, from 24 August to 5 September 2021.

The team won 14 gold medals and 19 medals overall, beating their previous best of 4 golds and 12 medals in London 2012 and overall medal of 9	gold.

Medalists

Competitors

Athletics 

12 Azerbaijani athlete in 16 events such as Kamil Aliyev (Long Jump T12), Olokhan Musayev (Discus Throw F56) & Samir Nabiyev (Shot Put F57) successfully to break through the qualifications for the 2020 Paralympics after breaking the qualification limit.

Judo

Powerlifting

Shooting

Azerbaijan entered one athletes into the Paralympic competition. Kamran Zeynalov successfully break the Paralympic qualification at the 2019 WSPS World Championships which was held in Sydney, Australia.

Swimming 

Three Azerbaijani swimmer has successfully entered the paralympic slot after breaking the 2019 World Championship & MQS.

Taekwondo

Azerbaijan qualified four athletes to compete at the Paralympics competition. All of them confirmed to compete at the games by winning the gold medal at the 2021 European Qualification Tournament in Sofia, Bulgaria.

See also
 Azerbaijan at the Paralympics
 Azerbaijan at the 2020 Summer Olympics

References 

Nations at the 2020 Summer Paralympics
2020
2021 in Azerbaijani sport